Karen K. Hsiao Ashe is a professor at the Department of Neurology and Neuroscience at the University of Minnesota (UMN) Medical School, where she holds the Edmund Wallace and Anne Marie Tulloch Chairs in Neurology and Neuroscience.  She is the founding director of the N. Bud Grossman Center for Memory Research and Care, and her specific research interest is memory loss resulting from Alzheimer's disease and related dementias. Her research has included the development of an animal model of Alzheimer's.

In  July 2022, concerns were raised that certain images in a 2006 Nature paper co-authored by Ashe's postdoctoral student Sylvain Lesné were manipulated.

Personal life and education
Ashe's parents came to the United States from China to pursue PhDs; her father, C.C. Hsiao, taught aerospace engineering at the University of Minnesota, and her mother, Joyce, was a biochemist. She has three younger siblings.

Attending the St. Paul Academy and Summit School in the 1970s, Ashe's interest in the brain began in primary school, where she excelled in math, along with music. She obtained her undergraduate degree at Harvard University in 1975 in chemistry and physics, starting as a sophomore at the age of 17. She went on to earn her PhD in brain and cognitive sciences at MIT in 1981 and her MD from Harvard in 1982. 

Ashe's husband, James is a neurologist; she has three children (two sons and a daughter).

Professional life

Early career
Between 1986 and 1989, she was a post-doctoral fellow at the University of California, San Francisco where she researched prion diseases and published with Stanley Prusiner. In 1989, she was the first author on a  paper published in Nature, entitled "Linkage of a prion protein missense variant to Gerstmann‑Sträussler syndrome", describing the discovery of a mutation linked to a neurodegenerative disease. She was the first author on a paper published in 1990 in Science, entitled "Spontaneous neurodegeneration in transgenic mice with mutant prion protein", describing the creation of a transgenic mouse modeling a neurodegenerative disease. According to the Minneapolis Star Tribune, she helped prove Prusiner's theory that prions cause neurodegenerative diseases. Prusiner recognized her contribution towards the Nobel Prize he won for that work, saying that Karen Hsiao "discovered a mutation in the PrP gene that caused familial disease and reproduced the disease in transgenic mice".

Minnesota 
Ashe joined the University of Minnesota Medical School in 1992 as an assistant professor of neurology. She has also worked with the Minneapolis Veterans Affairs Health Care System. She was the founding director of the N. Bud Grossman Center for Memory Research and Care.  As of 2022, she has received over $28million in grants from the U.S. National Institutes of Health.

The Minneapolis Star Tribune described Ashe as a "distinguished professor considered by many to be on the short list for a Nobel Prize for her work".

Alzheimer's research

Amyloid-beta protein 
In 1996—early in her career at UMN—Ashe was the first author on a paper published in Science, entitled "Correlative memory deficits, Aβ elevation, and amyloid plaques in transgenic mice", describing a mouse model of Alzheimer's disease, which furthered her rising star as a scientist; the mice are used in research around the world, and students and scientists "come from all over the world to work with her", according to the Star Tribune. In 2006, three of her research papers made a list of the eighteen papers that had contributed the most to Alzheimer's research.

Ashe is a co-author on a 2006 paper published in Nature, entitled "A specific amyloid-β protein assembly in the brain impairs memory". The paper describes the Aβ*56 oligomer (known as amyloid beta star 56 and Aβ*56) correlating with memory loss in mice prior to the appearance of amyloid plaques. According to a Science article, in 2022 the paper was the fifth-highest cited paper in Alzheimer's research, with approximately 2,300 other articles citing it. The Guardian says the paper was "highly influential" and calls it "one of the most cited pieces of Alzheimer's disease research in the last two decades", writing that it has "dominated the field" of research. The Daily Telegraph states that the "seminal research paper" led to increased drug research funding worldwide. The paper was discussed at the Alzheimer Research Forum as a "star is born".

In 2015, Ashe was a co-author on a paper entitled "Quaternary structure defines a large class of amyloid-beta oligomers neutralized by sequestration", which defines two forms of Aβ based on quaternary structure, type 1 and type 2, that have different effects on memory function in mice. Type 1 is dispersed in the brain and associated with impaired memory. Type 2 is entrapped in amyloid plaques and does not impair memory. In 2020, she published a review summarizing this work, entitled "The biogenesis and biology of amyloid β oligomers in the brain".

2022 investigation 
In July 2022, concerns were raised by Matthew Schrag, a Vanderbilt University neuroscientist, that certain images in the 2006 Nature paper were manipulated in the paper co-authored by Ashe's postdoctoral Sylvain Lesné, whom she hired in 2002. These concerns were published in an article in Science authored by Charles Piller which questioned the association between the Aβ*56 protein and dementia symptoms. Ashe stated in July 2022 via email that "it is devastating to discover that a colleague may have misled me and the scientific community [... it is also] distressing that a major scientific journal has blatantly misrepresented the implications of my work." Ashe has stated that the edited images, which she agrees "should not have occurred", do not change the conclusions of the paper. No image inconsistencies have been found in other work published by Ashe without Lesné as a co-author.

UMN is investigating the reports as of July 2022. The editors of Nature responded with a July 14, 2022 note stating they were aware of and investigating the concerns raised, that a "further editorial response [would] follow as soon as possible", and that "readers are advised to use caution when using results reported therein". The NIH, where Schrag lodged the whistleblower report, is also investigating the matter. Retraction Watch states that Ashe co-authored with Lesné other disputed papers, and that the authors in the disputed work do not overlap except for two from UMN Department of Neuroscience.

Honors and awards

Ashe was awarded the Metlife Foundation Award for Medical Research in Alzheimer's Disease in 2005. Ashe also earned the Potamkin Prize in 2006 for her Alzheimer's research, shortly after the publication of the 2006 Nature paper. 

In 2009, Ashe was elected to the National Academy of Medicine for her achievements in medicine.

Selected publications

Notes

References

External links
Official link at University of Minnesota web site
 Science podcast July 22, 2022, with Charles Piller, author of Science article

Academic scandals
Alzheimer's disease researchers
Biochemists
University of Minnesota faculty
Harvard Medical School alumni
Massachusetts Institute of Technology School of Science alumni
Living people
Members of the National Academy of Medicine
Year of birth missing (living people)
American academics of Chinese descent